Long Duk Dong is a fictional character who appears in Sixteen Candles, a 1984 American coming-of-age comedy film written and directed by John Hughes. Played by Japanese American actor Gedde Watanabe, the character is a Chinese foreign exchange student and a supporting character in the film set at a US suburban high school. The character has been called an offensive stereotype of Asian people.

Fictional appearance
In Sixteen Candles (1984), Long Duk Dong (played by Gedde Watanabe) is a Chinese foreign exchange student who stays with the grandparents of the film's protagonist Samantha (played by Molly Ringwald). He appears accompanied by a gong sound. He practices his conversational English with others, has his hair parted down the middle as an uncool style, is mystified by American food, and calls himself "The Donger". He also finds a love interest, an athletic large-breasted young woman who is physically larger than him.

Susannah Gora, writing about Sixteen Candles, said, "The role of 'The Donger' is pure comedy; a gong sounds every time Dong enters a scene. With his thick accent and bumbled attempts at American catchphrases ('Whass happenin', haaht stuff?'), everything Long Duk Dong says and does is understandably offensive—but is also, admittedly, hilarious."

Casting and performance

Actor Gedde Watanabe, a Japanese American from Ogden, Utah, was cast as Long Duk Dong in what was "his big Hollywood break". Before his audition, Watanabe had been in New York City performing for the musical Pacific Overtures at The Public Theater. His agent had informed him of the role as a foreign exchange student, and Watanabe decided to spend time "with a friend... who had a thick Korean accent" and "went to audition in character using [the] friend's accent". Watanabe recalled his portrayal attempt, "My training and my teachers had taught me that getting a character is about going for the intention. The Donger loved everything about America: the fun, the girls, the cars. So I didn't so much go for the jokes, but played to his excitement and enthusiasm." He auditioned for casting director Jackie Burch in-character, convincing her that he was from Korea and barely spoke English. Since Burch used to teach deaf people, she tried to use sign language with him before he revealed that he was born in Ogden, Utah. Director John Hughes was also originally fooled. When Hughes first heard Watanabe speak with his normal American accent, he chuckled and said: “Boy, was I duped.”

For the exercise machine sequence, Watanabe had found the machine in the attic of the mansion that was rented to use as the protagonist's family's household. He said of his character's perspective of the machine, "He wouldn't have known what that thing was. he would've thought it was something that cleans rice or makes tofu." Watanabe showed the machine to Hughes, who ultimately filmed the sequence in which Long Duk Dong and his American girlfriend awkwardly ride the machine together.

Watanabe said some sequences with Long Duk Dong were left out of the final cut of the movie including a scene with him and his love interest in bed smoking and a rap performance at the school dance which got everyone dancing. Watanabe said the rap went something like: 'I like Coca-Cola, lady skate roller, rock 'n' rolla'". Watanabe expressed his hope that Universal would bring back Long Duk Dong's rap in a future release of the film.

Watanabe said he had "a great experience" making Sixteen Candles but recognized in retrospect that he was "a bit naive" about his role. He said, "I was making people laugh. I didn't realize how it was going to affect people." He said that "some time" after the film appeared in theaters, he learned how many people were upset about his character, recalling an experience at the Metropolitan Museum of Art when an Asian woman came up to him to complain about his portrayal. Watanabe said, "I kind of understood, and I reasoned with it. But at the same time, I didn't really think of it that way... Back then I didn't understand as much as I do now. I was a little bit ignorant, too, because I grew up in Utah. I had a very strange upbringing where I didn't experience that much racism. I just thought I was a part of everybody else."

After Sixteen Candles, Watanabe was cast in several accented roles but later mostly stopped using exaggerated Asian accents for his roles. The actor did recognize the popularity of his character and created voice mail messages in the voice of Long Duk Dong to auction off for charity.

Contemporary critical reception
Roger Ebert of the Chicago Sun-Times gave the film a positive review and said of the character, "There are a lot of effective performances in this movie, including... Gedde Watanabe as the exchange student (he elevates his role from a potentially offensive stereotype to high comedy)." Janet Maslin, writing for The New York Times, said, "When the movie goes too far, as it does with a stupid subplot about a sex-crazed Oriental exchange student or a running gag about a young woman in a body brace, at least it manages to bound back relatively soon thereafter."

Legacy as Asian caricature
Alison MacAdam wrote in NPR in 2008, "To some viewers, [Long Duk Dong] represents one of the most offensive Asian stereotypes Hollywood ever gave America." When the film came out in 1984, several Asian-American groups condemned the character "as stereotypical, racist and part of a long history of Hollywood's offensive depictions of Asian men".

In 2011, Susannah Gora, writing about the 1980s films of John Hughes, said, "The only significant non-white character in any of these films is also the basest caricature of all: Long Duk Dong... A heightened national sense of cultural sensitivity (or political correctness, depending on how you look at it) swept America and the movie studios in the early nineties, and so the 1980s were, in many ways, the last moment when racially questionable jokes regularly found their place in mainstream comedies." Actress Molly Ringwald, who starred in Sixteen Candles, wrote in 2018 that in the film, "Long Duk Dong... is a grotesque stereotype."

The co-founders of the Asian American popular culture magazine Giant Robot, Martin Wong and Eric Nakamura, said before Sixteen Candles, students of Asian descent in the United States were often nicknamed "Bruce Lee". After Sixteen Candles, they were nicknamed "Donger" after Long Duk Dong. Wong said, "If you're being called Long Duk Dong, you're comic relief amongst a sea of people unlike you." Nakamura said, "You're being portrayed as a guy who just came off a boat and who's out of control. It's like every bad stereotype possible, loaded into one character." In addition to being called "Donger", the students were taunted with quotes of the character's lines in poor English such as "Oh, sexy girlfriend."

Of Dong's love interest who is physically larger than him, Kent Ono and Vincent Pham write in Asian Americans And The Media, "The gender roles are switched. While this representation aims to provide comic relief, it both feminizes Asian American men and simultaneously constructs alternative gender and sexuality as aberrant." NPR's Kat Chow said, "To be sure, there's nothing wrong with swapping gender roles, on-screen or off. What's icky about this relationship is how the filmmakers present it... Dong's femininity makes him weak, and we're meant to laugh at this."

Catherine Driscoll, writing in Teen Film: A Critical Introduction, said Long Duk Dong in Sixteen Candles, Mr. Miyagi in The Karate Kid (1984), and Maria in West Side Story (1961) all represent "the homogenization of racial difference in US popular culture including teen film". Driscoll said of John Hughes, who directed Sixteen Candles and several other teen films, "Even critics who praise Hughes's sensitivity to adolescent drama acknowledge that his is a very partial picture of adolescence. The Hughes teen is white, suburban, and normatively middle-class... non-white characters appear in the background or are crass caricatures like Sixteen Candles Long Duk Dong (Gedde Watanabe)."

In the 2007 book Don't You Forget About Me:  Contemporary Writers on the Films of John Hughes, Long Duk Dong is described as defying stereotypes, noting that "uberdork Long Duk Dong proves himself to be a party animal" and "by the nights end the school's entire social strata will have turned upside down" with Samantha, the freshman geek, and also foreign exchange student Long Duk Dong finding romantic and social success.  

Gedde Watanabe commented that perhaps John Hughes thought he was breaking a stereotype with the character because Long Duk Dong was not the stereotypical nice studious Asian boy and was instead interested in going out and partying.

A 1980s cover band based in Lexington, Kentucky calls itself Long Duk Dong after the character. Band founder Shaun Justice said, "It's odd that a character that's not a primary character would have so much notability. But that one certainly did."

See also
Portrayal of East Asians in American film and theater

References

Bibliography

Further reading

External links
'Fresh Off the Boat' Tackles a 1980s Asian Caricature: Long Duk Dong at Wall Street Journal
The death of Long Duk Dong: ‘Crazy Rich Asians’ puts tired sidekick trope to rest at The Houston Chronicle

Fictional Asian people
Film characters introduced in 1984
Male characters in film
Ethnic humour
Race-related controversies in film
Fictional high school students